This was a new event in the ITF Women's Circuit in 2016.

Ema Burgić Bucko and Georgina García Pérez won the title, defeating Lenka Kunčíková and Karolína Stuchlá in the final, 6–4, 2–6, [12–10].

Seeds

Draw

References 
 Draw

Europe Tennis Center Ladies Open - Doubles